Alexandra Greenfield (born 1990) is a Welsh former road and track cyclist from Barry. She began competing at a young age with the Maindy Flyers children's cycle club before joining Cardiff Ajax CC. Greenfield holds the record for the 5 km Tandem Standing Start event on the track along with Katie Curtis, with a time of 7 minutes 4.424 seconds. The record was set in Newport Velodrome on 10 June 2004. She transitioned from 's former technical director and assistant directeur sportif, to be Cycling New Zealand's women's endurance assistant coach by mid-2018.

She became the British junior scratch race champion in 2007 as well as the junior European points race champion. In 2008, Greenfield retained her European points race title and added another title as a member of the junior team pursuit squad. She made her debut to the UCI Track Cycling World Cup Classics in the 2008–2009 season, taking third place in the scratch race in the first round in Manchester.

Palmarès

Track

2006
2nd points race, British National Track Championships (Senior category - despite being only 16)
1st  15km points race, British National Track Championships - Youth
1st  10km scratch race, British National Track Championships - Youth

2007
1st  points race, European Track Championships - Junior
2nd British National Derny Championships
3rd WCRA Derny Championships
1st  10km scratch race, British National Track Championships - Junior

2008
1st  points race, European Track Championships - Junior
1st  team pursuit, European Track Championships - Junior
3rd pursuit, British National Track Championships - Junior
3rd scratch race, 2008–2009 UCI Track Cycling World Cup Classics

2009
1st  Madison, British National Track Championships (with Dani King)

2010
4th scratch race, 2010 Commonwealth Games

Road

2003
2nd British National Circuit Race Championships - under 14
2004
1st girl, Kerry Youth Tour, (IRL)
2006
6th Tour de Junior Achterveld (NDL)

References

External links

Results at britishcycling.org.uk

 

1990 births
Living people
Welsh female cyclists
Sportspeople from Barry, Vale of Glamorgan
Cyclists at the 2010 Commonwealth Games
Commonwealth Games competitors for Wales